Clotilde-Suzanne Courcelles de Labrousse, commonly Suzette Labrousse or Suzanne Labrousse (1747–1821) was a French medium, known for her prophecies during the French Revolution, of which she was said to have foretold the outbreak. She was used by the Jacobins and Maximilien de Robespierre as a tool for political propaganda.

References
 Jacques-Alphonse Mahul, Annuaire nécrologique, ou Supplément annuel et continuation de toutes les biographies ou dictionnaires historiques, 3e année, 1822, Paris : Ponthieu, 1823, p.130-132 [5] [archive]

1747 births
1821 deaths
French occultists
People of the French Revolution
18th-century occultists